The 2022 Elle Spirit Open was a professional tennis tournament played on outdoor clay courts. It was the fifth edition of the tournament which was part of the 2022 ITF Women's World Tennis Tour. It took place in Montreux, Switzerland between 5 and 11 September 2022.

Champions

Singles

  Tamara Korpatsch def.  Emma Navarro, 6–4, 6–1

Doubles

  Inès Ibbou /  Naïma Karamoko def.  Jenny Dürst /  Weronika Falkowska 2–6, 6–3, [16–14]

Singles main draw entrants

Seeds

 1 Rankings are as of 29 August 2022.

Other entrants
The following players received wildcards into the singles main draw:
  Nadine Keller
  Bojana Klincov
  Leonie Küng
  Valentina Ryser

The following player received entry into the singles main draw using a protected ranking:
  Emiliana Arango

The following players received entry from the qualifying draw:
  Berta Bonardi
  Dia Evtimova
  Oana Gavrilă
  Inès Ibbou
  Anna Klasen
  Verena Meliss
  Chiara Scholl
  Sebastianna Scilipoti

References

External links
 2022 Elle Spirit Open at ITFtennis.com
 Official website

2022 ITF Women's World Tennis Tour
2022 in Swiss tennis
September 2022 sports events in Switzerland